This article is about the gross regional product (GRP) per capita of French regions and overseas departments in nominal values. Values are shown in EUR€. For easy comparison, all the GRP figures are converted into US$ according to annual average exchange rates. All values are rounded to the nearest hundred.

2018

See also 
List of French regions and overseas collectivities by GDP

Notes

References 

Regions and overseas departments by GRP per capita

GRP
Gross state product
France